The Gospel of Josephus was a modern pseudepigraph created by Luigi Moccia to raise publicity for a novel Moccia had written. The manuscript was written by Moccia in Greek, but was proven to be a hoax based on the modernity of the language and the form of the manuscript (loose sheets written on one side only). The Gospel was attributed to Flavius Josephus, a Jewish historian of the first century CE. The gospel was created in 1927.

See also 
 Josephus on Jesus
 List of Gospels

References

1927 non-fiction books
20th-century manuscripts
Apocryphal Gospels
Christian manuscripts
Greek manuscripts
Greek-language books
Italian manuscripts
Josephus
Modern pseudepigrapha